Neocollyris sichuanensis is a species of beetle in the genus Neocollyris in the family Cincindelidae (formerly placed in Carabidae). It was described by Naviaux in 1994.

References

Sichuanensis, Neocollyris
Beetles described in 1994